Markus Swoboda (born 5 February 1990) is an Austrian paracanoeist who has competed since the late 2000s. He won a gold medal in the K-1 200 m TA event at the 2010 ICF Canoe Sprint World Championships in Poznań.

References
 
 

1990 births
Living people
Austrian male canoeists
Paracanoeists of Austria
Paralympic medalists in paracanoe
Paralympic silver medalists for Austria
Paracanoeists at the 2016 Summer Paralympics
Medalists at the 2016 Summer Paralympics
ICF Canoe Sprint World Championships medalists in paracanoe
TA classification paracanoeists